The 1985 edition of A Song for Europe was held at the BBC Television Centre in Studio 1 on 9 April, hosted by a suited Terry Wogan. The theme music (as it has been in previous years) was Te Deum. The BBC Concert Orchestra under the direction of John Coleman as conductor accompanied all the songs, but despite performing live, the orchestra was off-screen, behind the set.

Before Eurovision

A Song for Europe 
In all, 333 songs were originally submitted to the Music Publisher's Association, with 8 songs chosen. Songwriters could only submit a maximum of two songs to the MPA, but the identity of the writers was not disclosed to the MPA judges. Due to the poor reception of the UK entry in the previous year's Eurovision Song Contest, the BBC wanted to revert to the method used to select the UK entry used from 1964-1975 and approached both Bonnie Tyler and when she was unavailable, Lena Zavaroni to represent the UK and perform all the shortlisted songs in the UK heat. The MPA rebuffed the BBC's concept, wanting the composers and authors the option of choosing their own performers. A compromise rule was introduced, stating that no groups (more than 2 performers) were allowed to take part and writers would be limited to two entries each, however this rule was only in place for this one year. The songs were selected by around 90 people, DJs, producers and publishers.

Notable songwriters and performers included Paul Curtis who had had entries in the Eurovision final as well as a large number of previous entries in various UK heats, including writing the winning song in 1975. Despite the rule limiting song-writers to two entries, both his songs written with Graham Sacher reached the final eight. Together, Curtis and Sacher had won the A Song for Europe 1984 contest. 1970s glam rock singer Alvin Stardust (who had recently enjoyed a comeback in the charts) appeared as a performer as did Fiona Kennedy who was at the time a presenter of TV's Record Breakers. Annabel is Annabel Layton who competed at A Song for Europe 1981 contest as part of Unity. Des Dyer had been the lead singer of the group 'Casablanca' who'd placed 3rd in the A Song for Europe 1983 contest. He would later be one of the UK's backing singers at the Eurovision Song Contest 1988.

Final 
The show opened with a group of dancers, dancing to old Eurovision songs: "Making Your Mind Up", "Waterloo", "Puppet on a String", "Save Your Kisses for Me", "Boom Bang-a-Bang" and "Congratulations". The artists were introduced on stage with captions on screen, followed by presenter Terry Wogan. The songs had been first previewed in the previous week on the Wogan TV show.

Nine regional juries located in Birmingham, Cardiff, Manchester, Belfast, Glasgow, London, Norwich, Plymouth and Bristol voted for the songs. Each jury region awarded 15, 12, 10, 9, 8, 7, 6 and 5 points to the songs.

UK Discography 
Vikki - Love Is...: PRT 7P326 (7" Single)/12P326 (12" Single).
Peter Beckett - I'm Crying: MCA MCA959.
Alvin Stardust - (The) Clock On The Wall: Chrysalis ALVIN1 (Single withdrawn)/ALV3 (EP Release).
James Oliver - What We Say With Our Eyes: Ritz RITZ100.
Des Dyer - Voice Of America^: Splash CPS1005.
Annabell - Let Me Love You One More Time: Magnet MAG278.
Kerri Wells - Dancing In The Night: Magnet MAG279.
Redway & Kennedy - So Do I: MCA MCA960.
^Released in 1986 with alternative lyrics. Original track released only in Germany (TELDEC 6.14369).
(Tracks listed by their label details which in some cases didn't correspond with the contest entrants.)

At Eurovision 
The UK entered Vikki and "Love Is..." in the 1985 Eurovision Song Contest, finishing in fourth place, gaining 100 points overall. Although the song did not receive any country's twelve points, it still managed to score with every jury but one (Cyprus). The British jury awarded their twelve points to the eventual winners, Norway's Bobbysocks! with "La det swinge".

The final was broadcast on BBC 1 with Terry Wogan providing the commentary, Wogan actually commentated from BBC TV Centre in London as he was suffering from flu and was unable to fly to Gothenburg. BBC Radio 2 again decided not to broadcast the contest, but the contest was broadcast on British Forces Radio with commentary provided by Richard Nankivell. Colin Berry served as spokesperson for the UK jury.

Voting

References 

1985
Countries in the Eurovision Song Contest 1985
Eurovision
Eurovision